George Lawrence Neal (July 27, 1880 – June 29, 1947) was an American Negro league infielder and manager between 1909 and 1911.

A native of Springfield, Illinois, Neal made his Negro leagues debut in 1909 as player-manager with the Buxton Wonders. He went on to play for the Chicago Giants and Leland Giants in 1911. A "colorful player who used to humiliate opponents by turning cartwheels around the bases instead of running," Neal died in Springfield in 1947 at age 66.

References

External links
  and Seamheads

1880 births
1947 deaths
Buxton Wonders players
Chicago Giants players
Leland Giants players
Negro league baseball managers
20th-century African-American people
Baseball infielders